Jack Daniel's Properties, Inc. v. VIP Products LLC (Docket 22-148) is a pending United States Supreme Court case involving parody and trademark law. The case deals with a dog toy shaped similar to a Jack Daniel's whiskey bottle and label, but with parody elements, which Jack Daniel's asserts violates their trademark.

Background
VIP Products specializes in making dog toys. Among their line is a series of Silly Squeakers, dog toys that are shaped and look like well know alcoholic beverages, but using dog-related puns. One of these was a produced called "Bad Spaniels" which was shaped similarly to the Jack Daniel's whiskey bottle and label, with the dog puns in certain places, such as replacing the "Old No. 7 Brand Tennessee Sour Mash Whiskey" portion of the label with "Old No. 2, on your Tennessee carpet". The toy also including language that it was not associated with Jack Daniel's.

Jack Daniel's warned VIP Products of possible infringement of the trade dress related to their name, whiskey bottle, and labelling. VIP instead filed suit to get a declaration that their product was within fair use allowances by parody, as well as to cancel Jack Daniel's trademark on its bottle design. In the United States District Court for the District of Arizona, Judge Stephen M. McNamee ruled in favor of Jack Daniel's, finding that VIP's use of the trademarked elements were not protected by the First Amendment, and diluted Jack Daniel's trademarks, and placed an injunction on VIP from selling the toy.

VIP appealed to the United States Court of Appeals for the Ninth Circuit, which reversed most of Judge McNamee's ruling in a unanimous decision. The Ninth Circuit agreed that a more demanding test was required to dismiss the dog toy as an expressive work covered by the First Amendment.

Supreme Court
Jack Daniel's filed a petition for a writ of certiorari in the Supreme Court, asking it to hear the case. Jack Daniel's argued that while there may be First Amendment protections in VIP's product, they are making them at the expense of the Jack Daniel's trademark and public image. Several companies provided amicus briefs urging the Court to take the case, seeking the Court to rule in favor of protecting their trademarks from parody uses. In November 2022, the Court agreed to hear the case. Oral argument will likely take place on March 22, 2023.

References

United States Supreme Court cases